The 2009 Crown Royal 200 at the Glen was the ninth round of the 2009 Rolex Sports Car Series season. It took place at Watkins Glen International on August 7, 2009.

Race results
Class Winners in bold.

Crown Royal 200 at the Glen